Pierreclos is a commune in the Saône-et-Loire department in the region of Bourgogne-Franche-Comté in eastern France.

Geography
Situated 14 kilometers west of Mâcon and 14 kilometers south of Cluny, Pierreclos is a small vineyard village in the Tramayes county.

History
The name Pierreclos come from "Petra Clausa" meaning Closed stone, or tomb, in Latin. It was a necropolis for important people of the Roman Province.

Before the French Revolution, the history of the village was closely linked to its castle.

Demography
In 2016, the population of the village was 910 inhabitants.

Economy
Pierreclos is surrounded by vineyards which are used for great quality wines.
The main employer is a low-cost salted meat producer.

Important People
Alphonse De Lamartine had a child with Jacqueline de Pierreclos (Laurence in Jocelyn)

See also
Ruère
Communes of the Saône-et-Loire department

References

Communes of Saône-et-Loire